This is a list of the U.S. Billboard magazine Mainstream Top 40 number-one songs of 2000.

During 2000, a total of 14 singles hit number one on the chart, with 'N Sync's "Bye Bye Bye" being the longest-running number-one single of the year, leading the chart for ten weeks.

Chart history

See also
2000 in music

References 

Billboard charts
United States Mainstream Top 40
Mainstream Top 40 2000